Chen Jiming (born May 1962) is a former Chinese politician who spent his entire career in southwest China's Sichuan province. As of July 2019, he was under investigation by China's top anti-corruption agency. Previously he served as mayor and then party secretary of Ziyang. He was a delegate to the 13th National People's Congress.

Biography
Chen was born in Fushun County, Sichuan, in May 1962. Chen's father died from an illness in his early years, and the three Chen siblings were raised by his mother. After graduating from Sichuan College of Finance and Economics in 1984, he taught at the Party School in Zigong. Chen joined the Communist Party of China (CPC) in April 1984.

Chen began his political career in October 1987, when he became an official in the Zigong Municipal People's Government. In November 1997, he became deputy governor of Ziliujing District, rising to governor the next year. In December 2000, he was made secretary-general of Zigong Municipal People's Government, a position he held until March 2003, while he was promoted to vice mayor of the city. In August 2008, he was promoted again to become executive vice mayor. After  had come under investigation for "serious violations of discipline and laws" in September 2014, Chen succeeded him as mayor of Ziyang, in the following month, and then party secretary, the top political position in the city, beginning in June 2018.

Downfall
On 23 July 2019, he has been placed under investigation for "serious violations of discipline and laws" by the Central Commission for Discipline Inspection (CCDI), the party's internal disciplinary body, and the National Supervisory Commission, the highest anti-corruption agency of China. , whom was his superior in Zigong, was also put under disciplinary and supervisory investigation in October 2019. His qualification for delegates to the 13th National People's Congress was terminated on October 26. 

On 24 August 2020, he was expelled from the Communist Party and dismissed from public office. In September, he was indicted on suspicion of accepting bribes. On October 19, he received a sentence of ten years and six months in prison and fine of 800,000 yuan for taking bribes. According to the indictment, he used his various positions between 1998 and 2018 in Zigong and Ziyang to help others gain profits in engineering project, administrative examination and approval, job placement, enterprise financing, and in return, he illegally accepted money and goods worth about 10.84 million yuan ($1.69 million), personally or through his family members.

References

1962 births
Living people
People from Fushun County, Sichuan
Mayors of Ziyang
People's Republic of China politicians from Sichuan
Chinese Communist Party politicians from Sichuan
Delegates to the 13th National People's Congress